The nuclear receptor coactivator 3 also known as NCOA3 is a protein that, in humans, is encoded by the NCOA3 gene. NCOA3 is also frequently called 'amplified in breast 1' (AIB1), steroid receptor coactivator-3 (SRC-3), or thyroid hormone receptor activator molecule 1 (TRAM-1).

Function 

NCOA3 is a transcriptional coactivator protein that contains several nuclear receptor interacting domains and an intrinsic histone acetyltransferase activity.  NCOA3 is recruited to DNA promotion sites by ligand-activated nuclear receptors.  NCOA3, in turn, acylates histones, which makes downstream DNA more accessible to transcription.  Hence, NCOA3 assists nuclear receptors in the upregulation of gene expression.

Clinical significance

The ratio of PAX2 to AIB-1 protein expression may be predictive of the effectiveness of tamoxifen in breast cancer treatment.

Several molecular mechanisms implicate NCOA3 (AIB1) in the endocrine therapy resistance (depicted in the figure). Signaling pathways or mutations (i.e. HER2/neu overexpression, activating mutations in PIK3CA (PI3K), activating mutations in the proto-oncogene tyrosine-protein kinase Src, etc.) that lead to persistent activation of ERK and/or PIK3CA/AKT kinase pathways result, in one hand in an enhanced AIB1 transcriptional coactivation capacity, and in the other hand in the inhibition of the proteasome-dependent AIB1 turn-over and therefore, in AIB1 overexpression.  In both conditions, the equilibrium of estrogen receptor (ER) complex formation is displaced towards a transcriptionally active complex and thus, counteracting the inhibition caused by anti-estrogenic drugs such as tamoxifen or fulvestrant (selective estrogen receptor modulators). The result is the restoration of estrogen-sensitive gene transcription and the promotion of cancer progression and/or relapse.

Notably, tumors diagnosed with concomitant overexpression of AIB1 and HER2/neu have worse outcome with tamoxifen therapy than all other patients combined. In addition, dormant tumor cells of luminal breast cancers treated with endocrine therapy may acquire with time, mutations that alter kinase signalling pathways and ultimately enhance AIB1 oncogenic functions. Also, estrogen receptor-PAX2 complexes repress HER2/neu expression, but loss of PAX2 expression may result in de novo HER2/neu expression and initiate endocrine therapy resistance and relapse.

Interactions 
Nuclear receptor coactivator 3 has been shown to interact with:

 Androgen receptor, 
 CHUK and 
 CREB-binding protein, 
 DDX17, 
 DDX5, 
 Estrogen receptor alpha, 
 Estrogen receptor beta, 
 Glucocorticoid receptor, 
 IKBKG, 
 IKK2, 
 Peroxisome proliferator-activated receptor gamma,  and
 Retinoid X receptor alpha.

References

External links

Further reading 

 
 
 
 
 
 
 
 
 
 
 
 
 
 
 
 
 
 
 
 

Transcription coregulators
PAS-domain-containing proteins